The Canadian Screen Award for Best Visual Effects is an annual award, presented by the Academy of Canadian Cinema and Television to honour achievements in visual effects in Canadian film.

The award was introduced for the first time at the 32nd Genie Awards. It has been presented since as part of the Canadian Screen Awards.

Note that years listed here are the year of the nominated films' release, not the year of the award presentation.

2010s

2020s

See also
Prix Iris for Best Visual Effects

References

Film awards for Best Visual Effects
Editing in a Documentary